The 2022 South Africa rugby union tour of Europe was a series of matches played in November 2022 in Europe by the South Africa national rugby union team. The tour included four test matches against Ireland, France, Italy and England. The tour also featured two mid-week matches played by South Africa A against club sides Munster and Bristol Bears.

Squads

South Africa squad 
The South Africa squad for the tour was named on the 28 October 2022.

1On 4 November, Sbu Nkosi and Marco van Staden withdrew from the squad through injury.

South Africa A squad 
The South Africa A squad was also named on the 28 October 2022.

1On 4 November 2022, Jan-Hendrik Wessels withdrew from the squad due to injury. Elrigh Louw, Leolin Zas and JJ Kotze were called up to the South Africa A squad.

2On 7 November 2022, Dan du Preez and Jean-Luc du Preez were named as part of the South Africa A squad to play Munster despite not being named in the original South Africa A squad.

Test Matches 

Notes:
 Robbie Henshaw (Ireland) had originally been named to start, but withdrew the day before the match due to injury. He was replaced by Stuart McCloskey, whose place on the bench was taken by Jimmy O'Brien.
 Jimmy O'Brien (Ireland) made his international debut.
 Conor Murray (Ireland) became the eighth Irishman to earn his 100th test cap for Ireland.

Notes:
 Jasper Wiese (South Africa) had originally been named to start, but withdrew prior to the match due to injury. He was replaced by Kwagga Smith, whose place on the bench was taken by Deon Fourie.
 Bastien Chalureau, Reda Wardi (both France) and Manie Libbok (South Africa) made their international debuts.

Notes:
 South Africa recorded their biggest ever away victory over Italy (excluding their meeting in the 2019 Rugby World Cup, which took place in a neutral venue).

Notes:
 Manu Tuilagi (England) earned his 50th test cap.

Mid-week matches 

Player of the match: 
Paddy Patterson (Munster)

Player of the match: 
Joe Batley (Bristol Bears)

References